Vest-Telemark District Court (Norwegian: Vest-Telemark tingrett) is a district court located in Kviteseid, Norway.  It covers the municipalities of Kviteseid, Vinje, Tokke, Fyresdal, Nissedal and Seljord and is subordinate Agder Court of Appeal.

References

External links 
Official site 

Defunct district courts of Norway
Organisations based in Kviteseid